White Township may refer to the following places:

In Canada

 White Township, Nipissing District, Ontario (geographic / historical)

In the United States

Arkansas
 White Township, Ashley County, Arkansas
 White Township, Newton County, Arkansas
 White Township, Pike County, Arkansas
 White Township, Polk County, Arkansas

Kansas
 White Township, Kingman County, Kansas

Minnesota
 White Township, St. Louis County, Minnesota

Missouri
 White Township, Macon County, Missouri
 White Township, Benton County, Missouri

New Jersey
 White Township, Warren County, New Jersey

North Dakota
 White Township, Pierce County, North Dakota

Oklahoma
 White Township, McCurtain County, Oklahoma

Pennsylvania
 White Township, Beaver County, Pennsylvania
 White Township, Cambria County, Pennsylvania
 White Township, Indiana County, Pennsylvania

South Dakota
 White Township, Marshall County, South Dakota

See also
 White Oak Township (disambiguation)
 White River Township (disambiguation)
 White Rock Township (disambiguation)

Township name disambiguation pages